Shahabad, Iran may refer to:
 Eslamabad-e Gharb, Kermanshah Province, Iran
 Qaem Shahr, Mazandaran Province, Iran